The 2018 United States House of Representatives elections in Iowa were held on November 6, 2018, to elect the four U.S. representatives from the State of Iowa, one from each of the state's four congressional districts. The elections coincided with the gubernatorial election, as well as other elections to the House of Representatives, elections to the United States Senate, and various state and local elections. The state congressional delegation flipped from a 3–1 Republican majority to a 3–1 Democratic majority. The Democrats had last won the majority of Iowa's seats in the 2010 elections.

Overview

By district
Results of the 2018 United States House of Representatives elections in Iowa by district:

District 1

Republican Rod Blum, who has represented the district since 2015, was reelected to a second term with 54% of the vote in 2016.
However, in 2018, Democratic Iowa State Representative Abby Finkenauer went on to flip the district, being one of many swing districts that gave way in surprising margins for Democrats in a wave election.

The 1st district went for Donald Trump in the 2016 presidential election with a 49% to 45% margin, after voting for Barack Obama with a 56% to 43% margin in 2012.

Democratic primary

Candidates
Declared
 Abby Finkenauer, state representative
 Thomas Heckroth, former staffer for United States Senator Tom Harkin
 George Ramsey III, former military recruiter
 Courtney Rowe, engineer and Bernie Sanders delegate at the 2016 state convention

Declined
 Jeff Danielson, state senator
 Brent Oleson, Linn County Supervisor
 Steve Sodders, former state senator
 Stacey Walker, Linn County Supervisor

Endorsements

Results

Republican primary
Incumbent Rod Blum ran for re-election to a third term and was unopposed in the primary.

Results

Other Candidates
 Henry Gaff, co-chair of the Iowa Green Party, announced he was running as a Green Party candidate. Gaff was only 18, meaning he would not have met the U.S. Constitution's required minimum age of 25 to be elected to the House of Representatives.
 Troy Hageman, activist (Libertarian)

General election

Debates
Complete video of debate, October 5, 2018
Complete video of debate, October 16, 2018

Predictions

Polling

Results

District 2

Democratic Representative Dave Loebsack, who has represented the district since 2007, was reelected to a sixth term with 54% of the vote in 2016. Loebsack ran for reelection.

The 2nd district went for Donald Trump in the 2016 presidential election with a 49% to 45% margin, after voting for Barack Obama with a 56% to 43% margin in 2012.

Democratic primary

Incumbent Dave Loebsack ran for re-election to a seventh term in office and was unopposed in the primary.

Results

Republican primary

Candidates
 Ginny Caligiuri, businesswoman (write-in)
 Christopher Peters, Republican nominee in 2016

 Declined
Bobby Kaufmann, state representative

Results

Independents
 Daniel Clark

General election

Predictions

Polling

Results

District 3

Republican David Young, who had represented the district since 2015, was reelected to a second term with 53% of the vote in 2016. He ran for a third term in 2018, but lost to Democratic candidate Cindy Axne.

The 3rd district went for Donald Trump in the 2016 presidential election with a 49% to 45% margin, after voting for Barack Obama with a 51% to 47% margin in 2012.

Democratic primary

Candidates
Declared
 Cindy Axne, businesswoman
 Pete D'Alessandro, political consultant
 Eddie Mauro, activist

Did not make ballot
 Theresa Greenfield, real estate executive, failed to make the primary ballot. After her campaign manager was fired for forging signatures on nominating papers, she attempted to re-collect the 1,790 signatures necessary to make the ballot, but did not get enough signatures.

Withdrew
 Austin Frerick, former Treasury Department economist
 Paul Knupp, psychiatric rehabilitation practitioner and minister, withdrew from the Democratic primary to join the Green party
 Heather Ryan, nominee for KY-01 in 2008
 Anna Ryon, attorney with the Office of Consumer Advocate
 Mike Sherzan, businessman and candidate in 2016

Declined
 John Norris, former chief of staff to Governor Tom Vilsack, former Federal Energy Regulatory Commission member and nominee for IA-04 in 2002 (running for Governor)

Endorsements

Polling

Results

Republican primary
David Young ran for reelection to a third term in office. No other Republican filed to challenge him.

Results

General election

Debates
Complete video of debate, October 11, 2018

Predictions

Polling

Results

District 4

Republican Representative Steve King, who had represented the district since 2013 and previously represented the 5th district from 2003 to 2013, was reelected to a ninth term in congress in 2018.

The 4th district went for Donald Trump in the 2016 presidential election with a 61% to 34% margin, after voting for Mitt Romney with a 53% to 45% margin in 2012.

Democratic primary

Candidates
Declared
 Leann Jacobsen, Spencer City Councilwoman
 John Paschen, physician
 J. D. Scholten, paralegal and former professional baseball player

Withdrew
 Paul Dahl, candidate for Governor of Iowa in 2014
 Kim Weaver, nominee in 2016

Declined
 Dirk Deam, Iowa State University political science professor
 Chris Hall, state representative

Results

Republican primary

Results

General election
The election on November 6, 2018, was between Republican Steve King and Democrat J. D. Scholten. King declined to debate Scholten.  King won by the slimmest margin of victory in his congressional electoral career.

Endorsements

Predictions

Polling

Results

References

External links
Candidates at Vote Smart
Candidates at Ballotpedia
Campaign finance at FEC
Campaign finance at OpenSecrets

Official campaign websites for first district candidates
Rod Blum (R) for Congress
Abby Finkenauer (D) for Congress

Official campaign websites for second district candidates
Daniel Clark (G) for Congress
Dave Loebsack (D) for Congress
Dr. Christopher Peters (R) for Congress

Official campaign websites for third district candidates
David Young (R) for Congress
Cindy Axne (D) for Congress

Official campaign websites for fourth district candidates
Steve King (R) for Congress
JD Scholten (D) for Congress

House
Iowa
2018